Charlottenlund Upper Secondary School is the largest upper secondary school in the Jakobsli area of Trondheim, county of Trondelag in Norway. It is located about 4 km east of Trondheim city centre. The school has approximately 1,300 students, 250 employees and the current headmaster is Marit Flak Stovner.

The school was originally formed in 1970 as Brundalen Upper Secondary School, but the history of the school can be traced back as far as 1883. In 2002, Brunsdalen Upper Secondary School was merged with Charlottenlund Upper Secondary School, which initially retained the name Brunsdalen Upper Secondary School. The school subsequently changed its name to Charlottenlund Upper Secondary School in 2010. In 2012, the school moved into a new building near the old school (built 2011). The old school was demolished soon after.

Courses
Students can choose from: Study Specialisation, Music, Dance and Drama, Media and Communication, Art, Design and Architecture, Buildings and Building Technology, Hair, Interior and Flower Design, Information Technology and Media Production, Sales, Service and Travel, and Technology and Industrial arts.

Alumni
Øystein Djupedal, politician

References

External links
 Official website 
 (Adresseavisen) Tuberculosis at Brundalen November 2005 

Secondary schools in Norway
Education in Trondheim
Buildings and structures in Trondheim
Trøndelag County Municipality